The 76th season of the Campeonato Gaúcho kicked off on February 2, 1996 and ended on June 30, 1996. Twenty-eight teams participated. Holders Grêmio beat Juventude in the finals and won their 31st title. Pratense and Rio Grande were relegated.

Participating teams

System 
The championship would have five stages:

 Division A: The 14 clubs were divided into two groups of seven. In the first round, teams from one group play against teams from the other group once. In the second round, the teams from each group played in single round-robin format against the others in their group. The four group winners, plus the two teams with the most points in the sum of the rounds qualified to the Second phase, while the two teams with the fewest points in the sum of the rounds would dispute the Division B in 1997.
 Division B: The twelve teams that had qualified to Division B in the previous year joined the two teams that had been promoted from the Second level, and were divided into two groups of seven, in which each team played the teams of its own group in a double round-robin system. the best four teams in each group qualified to the Second phase of that division, the leader of each group earning a bonus point, while the two worst teams in each group would dispute the Relegation Playoffs. In the second phase, the remaining eight teams would be divided into two groups of four, in which each team played the teams of its own group in a double round-robin system. The best team of each group would qualify to the Second phase of the championship, and to the Division A of the following year.
 Relegation Playoffs: The four teams that had qualified to this round played each other in a double round-robin format. The two teams with the fewest points were relegated.
 Second phase: The eight remaining teams were divided into two groups of four, in which each team played the teams of its own group in a double round-robin system. The best teams in each group qualified to the Semifinals.
 Finals: The Second phase group winners played a two-legged knockout tie to define the champions.

Championship

Division A

First round

Group 1

Group 2

Second round

Group 1

Group 2

Final standings

Division B

Série 1

Série 2

Second phase

Série 3

Série 4

Relegation Playoffs

Second phase

Group 1

Group 2

Finals 

|}

Copa Daltro Menezes 

For the second semester, a state cup was held; the Copa Daltro Menezes. The ten teams played each other in a double round-robin system, with the two best teams qualifying automatically for the Second phase of the 1997 championship.

References 

Campeonato Gaúcho seasons
Gaúcho